Bernard of Clairvaux, O. Cist. (109020 August 1153), venerated as Saint Bernard, was an abbot, mystic, co-founder of the Knights Templars, and a major leader in the reformation of the Benedictine Order through the nascent Cistercian Order.

In the year 1128, Bernard attended the Council of Troyes, at which he traced the outlines of the Rule of the Knights Templar, which soon became an ideal of Christian nobility.

On the death of Pope Honorius II in 1130, a schism arose in the church. Bernard was a major proponent of Pope Innocent II, arguing effectively for his legitimacy over the Antipope Anacletus II.

In 1139, Bernard attended the Second Council of the Lateran and criticized Peter Abelard vocally. Bernard advocated crusades in general and convinced many to participate in the unsuccessful Second Crusade, notably through a famous sermon at Vézelay (1146).

Bernard was canonized just 21 years after his death by Pope Alexander III. In 1830 Pope Pius VIII declared him a Doctor of the Church.

Early life (1090–1113)
Bernard was the third of seven children, six of whom were sons. Aged nine, he was sent to a school at Châtillon-sur-Seine run by the secular canons of Saint-Vorles. Bernard had an interest in literature and rhetoric. He had a special devotion to the Virgin Mary, and he later wrote several works about the Queen of Heaven.

Bernard emphasized the value of a personally held faith, with the life of Christ as a model and new emphasis on the Virgin Mary. In opposition to the rational approach to divine understanding used by the scholastics, Bernard preached an immediate faith, in which the intercessor was the Virgin Mary.

Bernard was nineteen years old when his mother died. During his youth, he did not escape trying temptations and around this time he thought of living a life of solitude and prayer.

In 1098, a group led by Robert of Molesme had founded Cîteaux Abbey, near Dijon, with the purpose of living literally according to the Rule of St Benedict. After his mother died, Bernard decided to go to Cîteaux. In 1113 he and thirty other young noblemen of Burgundy sought admission into the new monastery. Bernard's example was so convincing that scores followed him into the monastic life.

Abbot of Clairvaux (1115–28)

The little community of reformed Benedictines at Cîteaux grew rapidly. Three years after entering, Bernard was sent with a group of twelve monks to found a new house at Vallée d'Absinthe, in the Diocese of Langres. This Bernard named Claire Vallée, or Clairvaux, on 25 June 1115, and the names of Bernard and Clairvaux soon became inseparable. During the absence of the Bishop of Langres, Bernard was blessed as abbot by William of Champeaux, Bishop of Châlons-sur-Marne. From then on a strong friendship grew between the abbot and the bishop, who was professor of theology at Notre Dame of Paris and the founder of St. Victor Abbey in Paris.

The beginnings of Clairvaux Abbey were austere; Bernard soon became ill. Nonetheless, candidates for the monastic life flocked to it in great numbers. Even his father and all his brothers entered Cîteaux, leaving only Humbeline, his sister, in the secular world. She, with the consent of her husband, later took the veil in the Benedictine nunnery of Jully-les-Nonnains. Gerard of Clairvaux, Bernard's older brother, became the cellarer of Cîteaux. Clairvaux soon started founding new communities. In 1118 Trois-Fontaines Abbey was founded in the diocese of Châlons; in 1119 Fontenay Abbey in the Diocese of Autun; and in 1121 Foigny Abbey near Vervins.

In addition to successes, Bernard also had his trials. During an absence from Clairvaux, the Grand Prior of the Abbey of Cluny went to Clairvaux and enticed away Bernard's cousin, Robert of Châtillon. This was the occasion of the longest and most emotional of Bernard's letters.

The monks of the powerful Benedictine abbey of Cluny were unhappy to see Cîteaux take the lead role among the monastic orders. They criticized the Cistercian way of life. At the solicitation of William of St.-Thierry, Bernard defended the Cistercians with his Apology. Peter the Venerable, abbot of Cluny, answered Bernard and assured him of his admiration and friendship. In the meantime, Cluny launched a reform and Abbot Suger, the minister of Louis VI of France, was converted by Bernard's Apology.

Doctor of the Church

In 1128, Bernard participated in the Council of Troyes, which had been convoked by Pope Honorius II, and was presided over by Cardinal Matthew of Albano. The purpose of this council was to settle certain disputes of the bishops of Paris, and regulate other matters of the Church of France. The bishops made Bernard secretary of the council, and charged him with drawing up the synodal statutes. After the council, the bishop of Verdun was deposed. It was at this council that Bernard composed a rule for the Knights Templar; it soon became an ideal of Christian nobility. Around this time, he praised them in his .

Schism
Bernard's influence was soon felt in provincial affairs. He defended the rights of the Church against the encroachments of kings and princes, and recalled to their duty Henri Sanglier, archbishop of Sens and Stephen of Senlis, bishop of Paris. When Honorius II died in 1130, a schism broke out in the Church by the election of two popes, Pope Innocent II and Antipope Anacletus II. Innocent, having been banished from Rome by Anacletus, took refuge in France. King Louis VI convened a national council of the French bishops at Étampes and Bernard, summoned there by the bishops, was chosen to judge between the rival popes. He decided in favour of Innocent.

Bernard travelled on to Italy and reconciled Pisa with Genoa, and Milan with the pope. The same year Bernard was again at the Council of Reims at the side of Innocent II. He then went to Aquitaine where he succeeded for the time in detaching William X, Duke of Aquitaine, from the cause of Anacletus.

Germany had decided to support Innocent through Norbert of Xanten, who was a friend of Bernard's. However, Innocent insisted on Bernard's company when he met with Lothair II, Holy Roman Emperor. Lothair II became Innocent's strongest ally among the nobility. Although the councils of Étampes, Würzburg, Clermont, and Rheims all supported Innocent, large portions of the Christian world still supported Anacletus.

In a letter by Bernard to German Emperor Lothair regarding Antipope Anacletus, Bernard wrote, "It is a disgrace for Christ that a Jew sits on the throne of St. Peter's" and "Anacletus has not even a good reputation with his friends, while Innocent is illustrious beyond all doubt."

Bernard wrote to Gerard of Angoulême (a letter known as Letter 126), which questioned Gerard's reasons for supporting Anacletus. Bernard later commented that Gerard was his most formidable opponent during the whole schism. After persuading Gerard, Bernard traveled to visit William X, Duke of Aquitaine. He was the hardest for Bernard to convince. He did not pledge allegiance to Innocent until 1135. After that, Bernard spent most of his time in Italy persuading the Italians to pledge allegiance to Innocent. The conflict ended when Anacletus died in 1138.

In 1132, Bernard accompanied Innocent II into Italy, and at Cluny the pope abolished the dues which Clairvaux used to pay to that abbey. This action gave rise to a quarrel between the White Monks and the Black Monks which lasted 20 years. In May of that year, the pope, supported by the army of Lothair III, entered Rome, but Lothair III, feeling himself too weak to resist the partisans of Anacletus, retired beyond the Alps, and Innocent sought refuge in Pisa in September 1133. Bernard had returned to France in June and was continuing the work of peacemaking which he had commenced in 1130. Towards the end of 1134, he made a second journey into Aquitaine, where William X had relapsed into schism. Bernard invited William to the Mass which he celebrated in the Church of La Couldre. At the Eucharist, he "admonished the Duke not to despise God as he did His servants". William yielded and the schism ended. Bernard went again to Italy, where Roger II of Sicily was endeavouring to withdraw the Pisans from their allegiance to Innocent. He recalled the city of Milan to obedience to the pope as they had followed the deposed Anselm V, Archbishop of Milan. For this, he was offered, and he refused, the archbishopric of Milan. He then returned to Clairvaux. Believing himself at last secure in his cloister, Bernard devoted himself to the composition of the works which won for him the title of "Doctor of the Church". He wrote at this time his sermons on the Song of Songs. In 1137, he was again forced to leave the abbey by order of the pope to put an end to the quarrel between Lothair and Roger of Sicily. At the conference held at Palermo, Bernard succeeded in convincing Roger of the rights of Innocent II. He also silenced the final supporters who sustained the schism. Anacletus died of "grief and disappointment" in 1138, and with him the schism ended.

In 1139, Bernard assisted at the Second Council of the Lateran, in which the surviving adherents of the schism were definitively condemned. About the same time, Bernard was visited at Clairvaux by Malachy, Primate of All Ireland, and a very close friendship formed between them. Malachy wanted to become a Cistercian, but the pope would not give his permission. Malachy died at Clairvaux in 1148.

Conflict with Abelard
Towards the close of the 11th century, a spirit of independence flourished within schools of philosophy and theology. The movement found an ardent and powerful advocate in Peter Abelard. Abelard's treatise on the Trinity had been condemned as heretical in 1121, and he was compelled to throw his own book into a fire. However, Abelard continued to develop his controversial teachings. Bernard is said to have held a meeting with Abelard intending to persuade him to amend his writings, during which Abelard repented and promised to do so. But once out of Bernard's presence, he reneged. Bernard then denounced Abelard to the pope and cardinals of the Curia. Abelard sought a debate with Bernard, but Bernard initially declined, saying he did not feel matters of such importance should be settled by logical analyses. Bernard's letters to William of St-Thierry also express his apprehension about confronting the preeminent logician. Abelard continued to press for a public debate, and made his challenge widely known, making it hard for Bernard to decline. In 1141, at the urgings of Abelard, the archbishop of Sens called a council of bishops, where Abelard and Bernard were to put their respective cases so Abelard would have a chance to clear his name. Bernard lobbied the prelates on the evening before the debate, swaying many of them to his view. The next day, after Bernard made his opening statement, Abelard decided to retire without attempting to answer. The council found in favour of Bernard and their judgment was confirmed by the pope. Abelard submitted without resistance, and he retired to Cluny to live under the protection of Peter the Venerable, where he died two years later.

Cistercian Order and heresy
Bernard had occupied himself in sending bands of monks from his overcrowded monastery into Germany, Sweden, England, Ireland, Portugal, Switzerland, and Italy. Some of these, at the command of Innocent II, took possession of Tre Fontane Abbey, from which Eugene III was chosen in 1145. Pope Innocent II died in the year 1143. His two successors, Pope Celestine II and Pope Lucius II, reigned only a short time, and then Bernard saw one of his disciples, Bernard of Pisa, and known thereafter as Eugene III, raised to the Chair of Saint Peter. Bernard sent him, at the pope's own request, various instructions which comprise the Book of Considerations, the predominating idea of which is that the reformation of the Church ought to commence with the sanctity of the pope. Temporal matters are merely accessories; the principles according to Bernard's work were that piety and meditation were to precede action.

Having previously helped end the schism within the Church, Bernard was now called upon to combat heresy. Henry of Lausanne, a former Cluniac monk, had adopted the teachings of the Petrobrusians, followers of Peter of Bruys and spread them in a modified form after Peter's death. Henry of Lausanne's followers became known as Henricians. In June 1145, at the invitation of Cardinal Alberic of Ostia, Bernard traveled in southern France. His preaching, aided by his ascetic looks and simple attire, helped doom the new sects. Both the Henrician and the Petrobrusian faiths began to die out by the end of that year. Soon afterwards, Henry of Lausanne was arrested, brought before the bishop of Toulouse, and probably imprisoned for life. In a letter to the people of Toulouse, undoubtedly written at the end of 1146, Bernard calls upon them to extirpate the last remnants of the heresy. He also preached against Catharism.

Crusade preaching

Second Crusade (1146–49)

News came at this time from the Holy Land that alarmed Christendom. Christians had been defeated at the Siege of Edessa and most of the county had fallen into the hands of the Seljuk Turks. The Kingdom of Jerusalem and the other Crusader states were threatened with similar disaster. Deputations of the bishops of Armenia solicited aid from the pope, and the King of France also sent ambassadors. In 1144 Eugene III commissioned Bernard to preach the Second Crusade and granted the same indulgences for it which Pope Urban II had accorded to the First Crusade.

There was at first virtually no popular enthusiasm for the crusade as there had been in 1095. Bernard found it expedient to dwell upon taking the cross as a potent means of gaining absolution for sin and attaining grace. On 31 March, with King Louis VII of France present, he preached to an enormous crowd in a field at Vézelay, making "the speech of his life". The full text has not survived, but a contemporary account says that "his voice rang out across the meadow like a celestial organ"

James Meeker Ludlow describes the scene romantically in his book The Age of the Crusades:

When Bernard was finished the crowd enlisted en masse; they supposedly ran out of cloth to make crosses. Bernard is said to have flung off his own robe and began tearing it into strips to make more. Others followed his example and he and his helpers were supposedly still producing crosses as night fell.

Unlike the First Crusade, the new venture attracted royalty, such as Eleanor of Aquitaine, Queen of France; Thierry of Alsace, Count of Flanders; Henry, the future Count of Champagne; Louis's brother Robert I of Dreux; Alphonse I of Toulouse; William II of Nevers; William de Warenne, 3rd Earl of Surrey; Hugh VII of Lusignan, Yves II, Count of Soissons; and numerous other nobles and bishops. But an even greater show of support came from the common people. Bernard wrote to the pope a few days afterwards, "Cities and castles are now empty. There is not left one man to seven women, and everywhere there are widows to still-living husbands."

Bernard then passed into Germany, and the reported miracles which multiplied almost at his every step undoubtedly contributed to the success of his mission. Conrad III of Germany and his nephew Frederick Barbarossa, received the cross from the hand of Bernard. Pope Eugenius came in person to France to encourage the enterprise. As in the First Crusade, the preaching led to attacks on Jews; a fanatical French monk named Radulphe was apparently inspiring massacres of Jews in the Rhineland, Cologne, Mainz, Worms, and Speyer, with Radulphe claiming Jews were not contributing financially to the rescue of the Holy Land. The archbishop of Cologne and the archbishop of Mainz were vehemently opposed to these attacks and asked Bernard to denounce them. This he did, but when the campaign continued, Bernard traveled from Flanders to Germany to deal with the problems in person. He then found Radulphe in Mainz and was able to silence him, returning him to his monastery.

The last years of Bernard's life were saddened by the failure of the Second Crusade he had preached, the entire responsibility for which was thrown upon him. Bernard considered it his duty to send an apology to the Pope and it is inserted in the second part of his "Book of Considerations." There he explains how the sins of the crusaders were the cause of their misfortune and failures.

Wendish Crusade (1147) 
Bernard preached the Wendish Crusade against Western Slavs, setting a goal to the crusade of battling them "until such a time as, by God's help, they shall either be converted or deleted".

Final years (1149–53)

The death of his contemporaries served as a warning to Bernard of his own approaching end. The first to die was Suger in 1152, of whom Bernard wrote to Eugene III, "If there is any precious vase adorning the palace of the King of Kings it is the soul of the venerable Suger". Conrad III and his son Henry died the same year. Bernard died at age sixty-three on 20 August 1153, after forty years of monastic life. He was buried at Clairvaux Abbey, and after its dissolution in 1792 by the French revolutionary government his remains were transferred to Troyes Cathedral.

Theology

Bernard was named a Doctor of the Church in 1830. At the 800th anniversary of his death, Pope Pius XII issued an encyclical about him, titled Doctor Mellifluus, in which he labeled him "The Last of the Fathers." The central elements of Bernard's Mariology are how he explained the virginity of Mary, the "Star of the Sea", and her role as Mediatrix.

The first abbot of Clairvaux developed a rich theology of sacred space and music, writing extensively on both.

John Calvin and Martin Luther quoted Bernard several times in support of the doctrine of Sola Fide. Calvin also quotes him in setting forth his doctrine of a forensic alien righteousness, or as it is commonly called imputed righteousness.

Spirituality

Bernard was instrumental in re-emphasizing the importance of lectio divina and contemplation for monks. Bernard had observed that when lectio divina was neglected, monasticism suffered. Bernard "noted centuries ago: the people who are their own spiritual directors have fools for disciples."

Legacy
Bernard's theology and Mariology continue to be of major importance, particularly within the Cistercian and Trappist Orders. Bernard helped found 163 monasteries in different parts of Europe. His influence led Alexander III to launch reforms that led to the establishment of canon law. He was canonized by Alexander III 18 January 1174. He is labeled the "Mellifluous Doctor" for his eloquence. Cistercians honour him as one of the greatest early Cistercians.

His feast day (observed in several denominations) is 20 August.

Bernard is Dante Alighieri's last guide, in Divine Comedy, as he travels through the Empyrean. Dante's choice appears to be based on Bernard's contemplative mysticism, his devotion to Mary, and his reputation for eloquence.

The Couvent et Basilique Saint-Bernard, a collection of buildings dating from the 12th, 17th and 19th centuries, is dedicated to Bernard and stands in his birthplace of Fontaine-lès-Dijon.

Hymns
Bernard of Clairvaux is the attributed author of poems often translated in English hymnals as:
 "O Sacred Head, Now Wounded"
 "Jesus the Very Thought of Thee"
 "Jesus, Thou Joy of Loving Hearts"

Works

Bernard's works include:

 Written in the defence of the Cistercians against the claims of the monks of Cluny.

.

 Addressed to Pope Eugene III.
 
 A letter to Henri Sanglier, Archbishop of Sens on the duties of bishops.

His sermons are also numerous:

 Most famous are his  (Sermons on the Song of Songs). Although it has at times been suggested that the sermon form is a rhetorical device in a set of works which were only ever designed to be read, since such finely polished and lengthy literary pieces could not accurately have been recorded by a monk while Bernard was preaching, recent scholarship has tended toward the theory that, although what exists in these texts was certainly the product of Bernard's writing, they likely found their origins in sermons preached to the monks of Clairvaux. Bernard began to write these in 1135 but died without completing the series, with 86 sermons complete. These sermons contain an autobiographical passage, sermon 26, mourning the death of his brother, Gerard. After Bernard died, the English Cistercian Gilbert of Hoyland continued Bernard's incomplete series of 86 sermons on the biblical Song of Songs. Gilbert wrote 47 sermons before he died in 1172, taking the series up to Chapter 5 of the Song of Songs. Another English Cistercian abbot, John of Ford, wrote another 120 sermons on the Song of Songs, so completing the Cistercian sermon-commentary on the book.
 There are 125 surviving  (Sermons on the Liturgical Year).
 547 letters survive.
 
Many letters, treatises, and other works, falsely attributed to him survive, and are now referred to as works by pseudo-Bernard. These include:

 This was probably written at some point in the thirteenth century. It circulated extensively in the Middle Ages under Bernard's name and was one of the most popular religious works of the later Middle Ages. Its theme is self-knowledge as the beginning of wisdom; it begins with the phrase "Many know much, but do not know themselves".

Translations
 On consideration, trans by George Lewis, (Oxford, 1908) https://books.google.com/books?id=kkoJAQAAIAAJ
 Select treatises of S. Bernard of Clairvaux: De diligendo Deo & De gradibus humilitatis et superbiae, (Cambridge: CUP, 1926)
 On loving God, and selections from sermons, edited by Hugh Martin, (London: SCM Press, 1959) [reprinted as (Westport, CO: Greenwood Press, 1981)]
 Cistercians and Cluniacs: St. Bernard's Apologia to Abbot William, trans M Casey. Cistercian Fathers series no. 1, (Kalamazoo: Cistercian Publications, 1970)
 The works of Bernard of Clairvaux. Vol.1, Treatises, 1, edited by M. Basil Pennington. Cistercian Fathers Series, no. 1. (Spencer, Mass.: Cistercian Publications, 1970) [contains the treatises Apologia to Abbot William and On Precept and Dispensation, and two shorter liturgical treatises]
 Bernard of Clairvaux, On the Song of Songs, 4 vols, Cistercian Fathers series nos 4, 7, 31, 40, (Spencer, MA: Cistercian Publications, 1971–80)
 Letter of Saint Bernard of Clairvaux on revision of Cistercian chant = Epistola S[ancti] Bernardi de revisione cantus Cisterciensis, edited and translated by Francis J. Guentner, (American Institute of Musicology, 1974)
 Treatises II : The steps of humility and pride on loving God, Cistercian Fathers series no. 13, (Washington: Cistercian Publications, 1984)
 Five books on consideration: advice to a Pope, translated by John D. Anderson & Elizabeth T. Kennan. Cistercian Fathers Series no. 37. (Kalamazoo, MI: Cistercian Publications, 1976)
 The Works of Bernard of Clairvaux. Volume Seven, Treatises III: On Grace and free choice. In praise of the new knighthood, translated by Conrad Greenia. Cistercian Fathers Series no. 19, (Kalamazoo, Michigan: Cistercian Publications Inc., 1977)
 The life and death of Saint Malachy, the Irishman translated and annotated by Robert T. Meyer, (Kalamazoo, Mich: Cistercian Publications, 1978)
 Bernard of Clairvaux, Homiliae in laudibus Virginis Matris, in Magnificat: homilies in praise of the Blessed Virgin Mary translated by Marie-Bernard Saïd and Grace Perigo, Cistercian Fathers Series no. 18, (Kalamazoo, MI: Cistercian Publications, 1979)
 Sermons on Conversion: on conversion, a sermon to clerics and Lenten sermons on the psalm "He Who Dwells"., Cistercian Fathers Series no. 25, (Kalamazoo, MI: Cistercian Publications, 1981)
 Bernard of Clairvaux, Song of Solomon, translated by Samuel J. Eales, (Minneapolis, MN: Klock & Klock, 1984)
 St. Bernard's sermons on the Blessed Virgin Mary, translated from the original Latin by a priest of Mount Melleray, (Chumleigh: Augustine, 1984)
 Bernard of Clairvaux, The twelve steps of humility and pride; and, On loving God, edited by Halcyon C. Backhouse, (London: Hodder and Stoughton, 1985)
 St. Bernard's sermons on the Nativity, translated from the original Latin by a priest of Mount Melleray, (Devon: Augustine, 1985)
 Bernard of Clairvaux : selected works, translation and foreword by G.R. Evans; introduction by Jean Leclercq; preface by Ewert H. Cousins, (New York: Paulist Press, 1987) [Contains the treatises On conversion, On the steps of humility and pride, On consideration, and On loving God; extracts from Sermons on The song of songs, and a selection of letters]
 Conrad Rudolph, The 'Things of Greater Importance': Bernard of Clairvaux's Apologia and the Medieval Attitude Toward Art, (Philadelphia: University of Pennsylvania Press, 1990) [Includes the Apologia in both Leclercq's Latin text and English translation]
 Love without measure: extracts from the writings of St Bernard of Clairvaux, introduced and arranged by Paul Diemer, Cistercian studies series no. 127, (Kalamazoo, Mich. : Cistercian Publications, 1990)
 Sermons for the summer season: liturgical sermons from Rogationtide and Pentecost, translated by Beverly Mayne Kienzle; additional translations by James Jarzembowski, (Kalamazoo, Mich: Cistercian Publications, 1991)
 Bernard of Clairvaux, On loving God, Cistercian Fathers series no. 13B, (Kalamazoo, MI: Cistercian Publications, 1995)
 Bernard of Clairvaux, The parables & the sentences, edited by Maureen M. O'Brien. Cistercian Fathers Series no. 55, (Kalamazoo, MI: Cistercian Publications, 2000)
 Bernard of Clairvaux, On baptism and the office of bishops, on the conduct and office of bishops, on baptism and other questions: two letter-treatises, translated by Pauline Matarasso. Cistercian Fathers Series no. 67, (Kalamazoo, MI: Cistercian Publications, 2004)
 Bernard of Clairvaux, Sermons for Advent and the Christmas season translated by Irene Edmonds, Wendy Mary Beckett, Conrad Greenia; edited by John Leinenweber; introduction by Wim Verbaal. Cistercian Fathers Series no. 51, (Kalamazoo, MI: Cistercian Publications, 2007)
 Bernard of Clairvaux, Sermons for Lent and the Easter Season, edited by John Leinenweber and Mark Scott, OCSO. Cistercian Fathers Series no. 52, (Kalamazoo, MI: Cistercian Publications, 2013)

See also

 List of Catholic saints
 List of Latin nicknames of the Middle Ages: Doctors in theology
 Scholasticism
 St. Bernard de Clairvaux Church
 Prayer to the shoulder wound of Jesus
 Saint Bernard of Clairvaux, patron saint archive
 Pope Eugene III

References

Notes

Citations

Sources

 Pierre Aubé: Saint Bernard de Clairvaux, Paris, éd. Fayard, 2003, 812 pages.

 6 tomes in 4 volumes.

 
 

 

 

 
 

 
 Adapted from

External links

 
 
 
 "St. Bernard, Abbot", Butler's Lives of the Saints
 Opera omnia Sancti Bernardi Claraevallensis his complete works, in Latin
 Audio on the life of St. Bernard of Clairvaux from waysideaudio.com
 Database with all known medieval representations of Bernard 
 Saint Bernard of Clairvaux at the Christian Iconography web site.
 "Here Followeth the Life of St. Bernard, the Mellifluous Doctor" from the Caxton translation of the Golden Legend
 "Two Accounts of the Early Career of St. Bernard" by William of Thierry and Arnold of Bonneval
 Saint Bernard of Clairvaux Abbot, Doctor of the Church-1153 at EWTN Global Catholic Network
 Colonnade Statue St Peter's Square
 Lewis E 26 De consideratione (On Consideration) at OPenn
 MS 484/11 Super cantica canticorum at OPenn

1090 births
1153 deaths
12th-century Christian mystics
12th-century Christian saints
12th-century French Roman Catholic priests
12th-century Roman Catholic theologians
Christian ethicists
Christians of the Second Crusade
Cistercian saints
Doctors of the Church
French Christian theologians
French Cistercians
French male writers
French religious writers
French Roman Catholic saints
Knights Templar
Medieval French saints
Medieval French theologians
People from Fontaine-lès-Dijon
Pre-Reformation saints of the Lutheran liturgical calendar
Catholic Mariology
Roman Catholic mystics
Miracle workers
12th-century French writers
12th-century Latin writers
Anglican saints
Monastic theologians